Mbundu may refer to:

 Northern Mbundu people (Ambundu)
 North Mbundu language (Kimbundu)
 Southern Mbundu people (Ovimbundu alternatively Southern Ambundu
 South Mbundu language (Umbundu)